NGC 4027 (also known as Arp 22) is a barred spiral galaxy approximately 83 million light-years away in the constellation Corvus.  It is also a peculiar galaxy because one of its spiral arms goes out more than the other.  This is probably due to a galactic collision in NGC 4027's past.

Galaxy group information

NGC 4027 is part of the NGC 4038 Group, a group of galaxies that also contains the Antennae Galaxies (NGC 4038/NGC 4039).

See also 

 NGC 4618 - a similar one-armed spiral galaxy
 NGC 4625 - a similar one-armed spiral galaxy
 NGC 5713 - a similar one-armed spiral galaxy

References

External links 

 NGC 4027
 The spiral galaxy NGC 4027
 

Barred spiral galaxies
Peculiar galaxies
NGC 4027
Corvus (constellation)
4027
37773
022
UGCA objects